Rósa Arianna "Rose" McGowan (born September 5, 1973) is an American actress and activist. After her film debut in a brief role in the comedy Encino Man (1992), McGowan achieved wider recognition for her performance in the dark comedy The Doom Generation (1995), receiving an Independent Spirit Award nomination for Best Debut Performance. She had her breakthrough in the horror film Scream (1996) and subsequently headlined the films Going All the Way (1997), Devil in the Flesh (1998) and Jawbreaker (1999).

During the 2000s, McGowan became known to television audiences for her role as Paige Matthews in The WB supernatural drama series Charmed (2001–2006). She went on to star in Robert Rodriguez and Quentin Tarantino's double-feature film Grindhouse (2007), for which she was nominated for the Saturn Award for Best Actress and the Scream Award for Best Scream Queen. She played the role of Josie Acosta in the action-thriller series Chosen (2014).

In 2017, Time recognized McGowan as one of the Silence Breakers, the magazine's Person of the Year, for speaking out about sexual assault and harassment, specifically in regard to the Harvey Weinstein sexual abuse cases and the Me Too movement. She has released a memoir, Brave, and starred in the four-part documentary series Citizen Rose, both in 2018.

Early life
Rósa Arianna McGowan was born on September 5, 1973, in Florence, Italy, to American parents Daniel McGowan, an artist, and Terri, a writer. She has two half-siblings. Her father ran an Italian chapter of the Children of God, which he and his wife were members of until 1978. McGowan spent her early childhood at the group's communes, often traveling through Europe with her parents.

Through her father's art contacts in Italy, she became a child model and appeared in Vogue Bambini and many other Italian magazines. Her parents returned to the United States when she was 10 years old, and settled in Eugene, Oregon. McGowan had an untraditional childhood, living as a teenage runaway in Portland, Oregon and associating with a group of drag queens in the city. When her parents divorced, she lived with her father in Seattle, Washington, attended Roosevelt High School and Nova Alternative High School, and worked at McDonald's. She took ballet lessons until she was 13. At 15, she officially emancipated herself from her parents and moved to Los Angeles.

Career

1990s: Early work and breakthrough 

After making her Hollywood film debut with a brief role in the Pauly Shore comedy Encino Man (1992), McGowan was cast in the leading role in Gregg Araki's dark comedy The Doom Generation (1995), which revolved around a threesome of teens who embark on a sex and violence-filled journey. The film brought her a much wider recognition and the attention of film critics; she received a nomination for Best Debut Performance at the 1996 Independent Spirit Awards. McGowan next obtained the role of Tatum Riley in the slasher cult film Scream (1996), as the casting director believed she best embodied the "spunky", "cynical" but "innocent" nature of the ill-fated character. Upon its release, the film became a huge critical and financial success, grossing over $100 million in North America and $173 million worldwide. Amid her growing public profile, she was the cover model for the Henry Mancini tribute album Shots in the Dark, which was released in 1996, and became the face of American clothing company Bebe from 1998 to 1999. In 1997, she appeared in the short film Seed, directed by San Francisco-born filmmaker Karin Thayer, and played opposite Peter O'Toole in the 1998 film adaptation of the Dean Koontz novel Phantoms.

McGowan spent the majority of the late 1990s headlining a variety of independent films, including roles in Nowhere (1997), where she reunited with Araki, as well as Southie (1996), Going All the Way (1997), Lewis and Clark and George (1997), and Devil in the Flesh (1998), where she usually played seductive and mysterious characters. She gained much attention for the revealing fishnet outfit she wore to the 1998 MTV Video Music Awards. While dating Marilyn Manson, McGowan appeared in a music video for the song "Coma White"; she performed backing vocals on the song "Posthuman". Both of these songs appear on the album Mechanical Animals (1998). In the dark comedy Jawbreaker (1999), she portrayed Courtney Shayne, a popular yet malevolent high school student who tries to cover up her involvement in a classmate's murder. McGowan based her performance on that of Gene Tierney's sociopathic character in Leave Her to Heaven (1945). To accompany the release of the film, Imperial Teen's music video for the song Yoo Hoo featured McGowan as her character harassing the band members with jawbreakers. Jawbreaker was a critical and commercial failure, but found success through home video release and subsequent television airings; it has developed a cult following. McGowan earned a nomination for Best Villain at the 1999 MTV Movie Awards.

2000s: Rise to prominence and critical recognition 
In 2001, McGowan was cast for the role of Paige Matthews in the popular WB supernatural drama series Charmed, as a replacement for the lead actress Shannen Doherty, who had left the show. In the show, about the trio of witches using their combined powers to protect innocent lives from evil beings, McGowan played the character from season four until its final eighth season. In the Charmed episode "Sense and Sense Ability", McGowan performed, in character, a cover of the Peggy Lee classic "Fever". In a review of the fourth season, Leigh H. Edwards of PopMatters added that the addition of Paige was "contrived and clunky", but welcomed the idea of McGowan joining the show as a witch "since she has major goth cred as Marilyn Manson's former flame". DVD Verdict's Cynthia Boris wrote that McGowan brought "a youthfulness" and "a fresh viewer perspective" to Charmed, further noting that "fans have come to enjoy her presence on the show." Sara Paige and Rachel Hyland of Geek Speak magazine described Paige as "snarky, compassionate and whimsical", and believed that "McGowan was well-suited for the role." At the 2001 Wand Awards, McGowan was nominated for Best New Cast Member and at the 2005 Family Television Awards, she won Favorite Sister, for her performance.

McGowan starred alongside Brendan Fraser, Bridget Fonda, and Whoopi Goldberg in the dark fantasy comedy Monkeybone (2001) as a cat girl from a limbo-like carnival landscape where nightmares are entertainment. Budgeted at US$75 million, the film only made US$7.6 million; McGowan felt that film "would've been incredible (at least the underworld part) if the men at 20th Century Fox (the suits) hadn't fired the director, a true artist, Henry Selick [half] the way through filming", and called his dismissal a "profoundly stupid move". During Charmed, McGowan portrayed actress-singer Ann-Margret in the CBS miniseries Elvis (2005), about the life of Elvis Presley. She also appeared briefly as the roommate of the titular character in Brian De Palma's The Black Dahlia (2006), a film noir shot in Los Angeles and Bulgaria and opposite Josh Hartnett, Scarlett Johansson, Aaron Eckhart and Hilary Swank.

In 2007, McGowan headlined Grindhouse, a double feature horror film by directors Quentin Tarantino and Robert Rodriguez. In Rodriguez's segment, Planet Terror, she starred as a go-go dancer and the leader of a group of rebels attempting to survive an onslaught of zombie-like creatures as they feud with a rogue military unit, while in Tarantino's segment, Death Proof, she played a brief role as a victim of a misogynistic, psychopathic stuntman who targets young women with his "death proof" stunt car. She performed three songs from the Planet Terror portion of Grindhouse, released on the film's soundtrack by the Varèse Sarabande label. The songs are entitled "You Belong to Me" (a Dean Martin/Jo Stafford cover), "Useless Talent #32", and "Two Against the World". While Grindhouse made a lackluster US$25.5 million in its theatrical release, it was the subject of much media coverage and critical acclaim from critics; James Berardinelli found McGowan to be the "standout here" and Mick LaSalle considered the film as "the best showcase of her career so far". Her next film release, Fifty Dead Men Walking (2008), revolved around Martin McGartland, a British agent who went undercover into the Provisional Irish Republican Army (IRA). McGowan played a woman in the upper ranks of the organisation who offers herself to McGartland. McGowan caused controversy in September 2008 whilst promoting the film at a Toronto International Film Festival press conference, where she stated: "I imagine, had I grown up in Belfast, I would 100% have been in the IRA. My heart just broke for the cause. Violence is not to be played out daily and provide an answer to problems, but I understand it." This prompted director Kari Skogland and the film's producers to issue a public apology, stating that McGowan's views did not reflect their own. The film found a limited audience in theaters while critical response was positive.

Also in 2008, McGowan took on a recurring role as a con artist on the acclaimed drama series Nip/Tuck, and co-hosted the TCM's film-series program The Essentials alongside Robert Osborne, discussing classic Hollywood film.

2010s: Independent films and professional expansion 
In 2010, McGowan shot a cameo in the Robert Rodriguez feature Machete, a role ultimately cut, but included on the DVD release, and played a semi-homeless junkie in the fantasy drama Dead Awake. In the 2011 sword and sorcery film Conan the Barbarian, a reimagining of the 1982 film of the same name which starred Arnold Schwarzenegger, McGowan starred as an evil half-human/half-witch. Roger Ebert described her role as a "piece of work", writing: "She has white pancake makeup, blood red lips, cute little facial tattoos and wickedly sharp metal talons on her fingers". Filming occurred between March and July 2010 in Bulgaria, and Conan was released on August 19, 2011. Budgeted at US$90 million, the film received negative reviews, and only grossed US$48.8 worldwide. McGowan also appeared on a Brian Transeau track called "Superfabulous", from his album Emotional Technology, which was also featured on the final Charmed soundtrack, The Final Chapter; the song has been featured in several films, including Win a Date with Tad Hamilton! and Raising Helen. In addition to her role in the big-budgeted Conan, McGowan starred in mainly independent productions during the early 2010s, such as the psychological thriller Rosewood Lane (2011) from director Victor Salva, the made-for-television film The Pastor's Wife (2011), alongside Michael Shanks, and a film adaptation of The Tell-Tale Heart, released in 2016. 

In an August 2011 interview, McGowan talked about her experience working on the film Rosewood Lane with director Victor Salva, who is a convicted child molester and child pornographer, stating, "I still don't really understand the whole story or history there, and I'd rather not, because it's not really my business. But he's an incredibly sweet and gentle man." McGowan lent her voice to the video games Darkwatch, playing a femme fatale named Tala, and Terminator Salvation, as a troubled soldier named Angie Salter. She guest-starred in an episode of Law & Order: Special Victims Unit as a grifter who targets New York sex clubs, and also in two episodes of Once Upon A Time between 2012 and 2014, playing the role of the young Cora Mills. She wrote and recorded a song titled "Protection", which was featured in her film Strange Hearts (2011). McGowan appeared in the Imperial Teen music video for "Yoo Hoo", which was featured on the Jawbreaker soundtrack, and she recorded the theme song from the film Dead Awake (2010). In the third season of Chosen (2014), a television series airing via Crackle, McGowan took on the role of an experienced hunter.

McGowan made her directorial debut with a short film called Dawn, which revolved around a teen from a strict family falls under the spell of a gas-station employee. The 17-minute piece premiered at the 2014 Sundance Film Festival, to critical acclaim; Way Too Indie noted: "This was a real gem of a short film. Dawn's salient literary and cultural references, paired with the film's high production value, gorgeous shots, its slow-burner buildup and gripping conclusion, bring something to the table for everyone, and portends an excellent directorial career for Ms. McGowan". She appeared in the music video for the 2014 single "Break the Rules" by Charli XCX. In September 2015, McGowan released her debut single, titled "RM486". The song has strong feminist themes, with its title being a play on the abortion drug RU486 and McGowan's initials.

The Sound (2017), an independent Canadian horror film, starred McGowan as a best-selling author and paranormal investigator alongside Christopher Lloyd and Michael Eklund. The Hollywood Reporter wrote of her role: "Despite her sympathetic situation, [it] isn't a particularly interesting character. A dismissive attitude and superior self-regard don't improve her likability either. McGowan seems comfortable with the role, however [...]". On January 30, 2018, McGowan released a memoir,  Brave, in which she details her childhood and her account of the assault by Harvey Weinstein and its aftermath. McGowan appears in the art film Indecision IV, which combines dance and gender issues. "Shot in one continuous take, the film [...] was created in May 2018, during a watershed moment in McGowan's life and is a physical expression of her state of mind at that time," a press statement stated. The piece was commissioned by UK's Heist Gallery, and is set to have special screenings at the Institute of Light in East London on December 15 and 16, with proceeds going to the charity Refuge. McGowan expressed interest in recording an album of her own. During an interview with Living TV, she said, "I was actually thinking of going back and doing more soulful tunes and older tunes ... and I would love to, when I have a little bit more time." On April 21, 2020, she announced that her debut studio album Planet 9, originally released in 2018, would be re-released on April 24.

In the media

Activism and image 
McGowan is an activist for gay rights and campaigned against California's Proposition 8, which sought to ban same-sex marriage in the state in 2008. She is also known as an activist for Boston Terriers. She has two, named Bug and Fester, and has personally donated to various Boston Terrier rescues. McGowan reportedly encouraged friends to donate to Boston Terrier Rescue Net, and according to BTRN: "Having fallen in love with Bug and Fester, her friends donated generously. It amounted to a considerable contribution, which will go a long way in helping BTRN and the needy volunteers who selflessly give to deserving Bostons."

In late 2009, McGowan was among several celebrities who participated in the protest NOH8. In 2017, Time recognized McGowan as one of the Silence Breakers, the magazine's Person of the Year, for speaking out about sexual assault and harassment, specifically in regards to the Harvey Weinstein sexual abuse cases and the Me Too movement. On January 31, 2018, Citizen Rose, a four-part documentary series produced by Bunim/Murray Productions following McGowan and her role in the Me Too movement premiered. In August 2018, McGowan was announced to receive the Inspiration Award at the GQ Men Of The Year Awards.

Views and controversies 
In May 2014, McGowan held a defiant party in support of the Brunei-owned Beverly Hills Hotel, despite a boycott over Brunei's anti-gay laws, which prescribes death by stoning for same-sex activities. McGowan explained her stance on the issue thus: "Boycotts only work when they hurt the target's bottom line. We are never going to affect the sultan's bottom line. He's worth $20 billion! This is a vanity project for him. It could sit empty for 100 years and he wouldn't even notice. But meanwhile, we're hurting all the wonderful, struggling people who work in the hotel. I'd like him to see that gays are real people. I think that's the only thing that would change his mind, not a boycott."

In November 2014, while discussing misogyny and sexism on Bret Easton Ellis' podcast, McGowan criticized the gay community for not doing more to help the cause of women's rights, saying, "I see now, basically, people who've fought for the right to stand on top of a float wearing an orange speedo and take molly. And, I see no help, and I see no paying it forward, and I have a huge problem with that. There are so many things to help and do, and I see no extending of a hand outside of the gay community to another community. And that's a problem for me." McGowan also stated, "Gays are as misogynistic as straight men, if not more so. I have an indictment of the gay community right now. I'm actually really upset with them." The characterization of LGBT rights activism being centered on drug use and wearing revealing clothing in public was criticized as homophobic or transphobic. She later apologized for generalizing gay men as misogynistic, but defended the rest of her comments. She explained that "I do expect more from a group of people that understands discrimination. … What I want is for gay rights activists to help other disenfranchised groups. These activists are experts while so many other groups flounder. It’s time to share the wealth and knowledge".

In 2015, McGowan criticized Caitlyn Jenner for stating that "the hardest part about being a woman is figuring out what to wear", after Jenner had been named "Woman of the Year" by Glamour. McGowan stated, "We are more than deciding what to wear. We are more than the stereotypes foisted upon us by people like you. You're a woman now? Well fucking learn that we have had a VERY different experience than your life of male privilege." In response to accusations of transphobia, McGowan stated, "Let me take this moment to point out that I am not, nor will I ever be, transphobic. The idea is laughable. Disliking something a trans person has said is no different than disliking something a man has said or that a woman has said. Being trans doesn't make one immune from criticism."

In early January 2020, McGowan apologized to Iran in a tweet sent out in the hours after a US airstrike in Iraq killed Iranian Major General Qasem Soleimani. She wrote, "Dear #Iran, The USA has disrespected your country, your flag, your people. 52% of us humbly apologize. We want peace with your nation. We are being held hostage by a terrorist regime. We do not know how to escape. Please do not kill us. #Soleimani" McGowan's tweet mistakenly included a GIF of the Iranian flag from the pre-revolutionary Pahlavi era.

McGowan has expressed support for Tara Reade, who accused Joe Biden of sexual assault, and criticized Hollywood stars for supporting Biden. In August 2020, McGowan criticized the Democratic Party for failing to "create change and provide support for citizens facing racial inequality, economic issues and police brutality". In April 2021 McGowan accused Twitter of censorship after her account was suspended for violating Twitter's non-consensual nudity policy after she tweeted an Alison Jackson art piece showing Bill Clinton being massaged by an unknown woman.

In an April 2021 interview on Fox News Primetime, McGowan accused the Democratic Party of being a "deep cult" whose leaders do not care about supporters and who hypocritically advance the status quo despite claims to support progressivism.

In September 2021, McGowan endorsed Larry Elder in the California recall election.

Personal life

In the early 1990s, McGowan, then relatively unknown, was involved for two years with a man she refers to as William, who, she claims, kept buying her exercise equipment and fashion magazines in an effort to persuade her to get thinner. She developed an eating disorder in her unsuccessful efforts to get her weight down to  like the women in the magazines. "I never was able to get below ," she wrote later. "I felt like a failure." That relationship and the eating disorder ended in early 1993 when McGowan met Brett Cantor, a part-owner of Hollywood's Dragonfly nightclub. Cantor was stabbed to death in his house that July, and McGowan stated that his murder left her "shattered". The killing remains unsolved.

McGowan had a three-and-a-half-year relationship with rock musician Marilyn Manson. After a formal engagement lasting two years, McGowan ended the relationship in 2001 over "lifestyle differences". Prior to the release of Grindhouse, there was speculation that McGowan was dating director Robert Rodriguez. In May 2007, it was reported that they confirmed their relationship while appearing hand-in-hand at the Cannes Film Festival. On October 12, 2007, it was announced by Zap2it.com that McGowan was engaged to Rodriguez. They reportedly split in October 2009. In July 2013, after one year of dating, McGowan became engaged to artist Davey Detail. They married on October 12, 2013, in Los Angeles. In February 2016, she filed for divorce from Detail, citing irreconcilable differences. The divorce was finalized later that year, in November.

In January 2019, McGowan pleaded no contest to a misdemeanor drug charge in Virginia concerning cocaine that was found in a wallet she left behind at Dulles International Airport in 2017. She received a US$2,500 fine and a suspended jail sentence. McGowan moved from New York to Mexico in early 2020 and as of February 2021, is a permanent resident of Mexico and lives in Tulum, Quintana Roo. McGowan has stated that she has no plans of moving back to the United States.

Harvey Weinstein sexual abuse allegations 

In October, 2017, The New York Times reported that McGowan received a $100,000 settlement from movie mogul Harvey Weinstein in relation to an alleged sexual assault in 1997. It was alleged that the encounter had taken place in a hotel room during the Sundance Film Festival.

On October 10, 2017, McGowan accused actor Ben Affleck of lying for saying he was "angry" over Weinstein's alleged abuse of women, but failing to indicate whether he knew about it, even though she had told him Weinstein had acted inappropriately towards her. Via Twitter, she also attacked other men in the movie industry, tweeting, "All of you Hollywood 'A-list' golden boys are LIARS....You all knew." She later clarified that she told Affleck, while crying, that she had "just come from Harvey's and he said, 'Goddamn it, I told him to stop doing that.' It's not like I'm raging at Ben Affleck. I never said to him, 'I was just raped.' It's just more to illustrate the point of this continual thing of everybody knowing and everybody being part of it, unwittingly or proactively."

On October 12, 2017, McGowan alleged that Harvey Weinstein had raped her, and that Amazon Studios dropped her project after she reported it. Later the same day, McGowan said that Twitter suspended her account for 12 hours after she repeatedly tweeted about Weinstein's sexual misconduct towards her. Twitter explained that McGowan's account had violated its privacy policy because one of her tweets included a private phone number. The New York Times reported, "Many Twitter users expressed outrage over Ms. McGowan's account being locked." After the tweet was removed, her account was unlocked several hours before the 12-hour ban was set to expire. Through his lawyer, David Boies, Weinstein at one point hired the private intelligence agency Black Cube to spy on McGowan and to stop outlets such as The New York Times and The New Yorker from reporting their investigations on Harvey Weinstein. On February 7, 2018, Jill Messick, McGowan's manager at the time of the alleged rape in 1997, died by suicide. Messick's family blamed Weinstein, the media, the public, and McGowan for her death.

In 2021, McGowan claimed that Jennifer Siebel Newsom, wife of California governor Gavin Newsom, attempted to bribe her in order to silence her allegations on Weinstein. A spokesperson for Siebel Newsom called McGowan's  claims a "complete fabrication".

In December 2021, a federal judge dismissed a racketeering lawsuit McGowan filed against Weinstein, lawyers David Boies and Lisa Bloom, and Black Cube in October 2019 after she failed to file documents by a December deadline, which occurred after she dismissed her attorneys in November 2021 and began representing herself in the suit.

Allegation of statutory rape against Alexander Payne 
In a 2018 interview with Ronan Farrow, McGowan accused a "prominent" man in Hollywood of statutory rape; she did not name the person in question. In August 2020, McGowan announced the man was filmmaker Alexander Payne, claiming that he had sex with her in California when she was 15 years old. Payne responded to McGowan's allegation by writing a guest column in Deadline Hollywood; he acknowledged a consensual relationship but denied any impropriety, stating that they had met when she was over the age of consent, which is 18 in California. Payne ended his statement writing, "While I cannot allow false statements about events twenty-nine years ago to go uncorrected, I will continue to wish only the best for Rose".

In 2020, McGowan alleged that, in 1937, Hal Roach was responsible for large-scale sexual abuse of actresses.

Filmography

Film

Television

Video games

Web series

Music videos

As director

Discography 
 Planet 9 (2018); reissued in 2020

Bibliography 
 Brave (Memoir; HarperOne, 2018)

Awards and recognition

Notes

References

External links 

 
 Maxim interview
 MoviesOnline Interview, Grindhouse

1973 births
Living people
20th-century American actresses
21st-century American actresses
Activists from Oregon
Actresses from Eugene, Oregon
Actresses from Seattle
Actors from Florence
American child models
American emigrants to Mexico
American expatriates in Italy
American film actresses
American television actresses
American video game actresses
American voice actresses
American LGBT rights activists
Musicians from Eugene, Oregon